The Tait–Ervin House, also known as Countryside, is a historic plantation house near Camden, Alabama.  The two-story wood-frame house was built in 1855 for Robert Tait by a builder named Henry Cook.  Robert was the grandson of Charles Tait, a United States Senator from Georgia.  The plantation was acquired after the American Civil War by Robert Tait's sister, Sarah Asbury Tait Ervin, and her husband, Dr. Robert Hugh Ervin.  Dr. Ervin served in both houses of the Alabama Legislature and was elected President Pro Tem of the state senate in 1872.  The house remained in the Ervin family until 1991, when it was sold to the Phillipi family.  The house was added to the National Register of Historic Places on February 24, 1995.

Gallery
Historic American Buildings Survey photographs from 1936:

References

External links

National Register of Historic Places in Wilcox County, Alabama
Houses on the National Register of Historic Places in Alabama
Houses completed in 1855
Plantation houses in Alabama
Houses in Wilcox County, Alabama
Historic American Buildings Survey in Alabama